Luther Alexander Bradley (born May 7, 1955) is a former professional American football player who played four seasons in the National Football League (NFL) for the Detroit Lions. He later played with the Chicago Blitz, Arizona Wranglers and Houston Gamblers of the United States Football League (USFL). He is the USFL's all-time interception leader.

Bradley earned the designation of a consensus All-American in  1977 for the national championship Notre Dame Fighting Irish.  He also started as a freshman on the 1973 Notre Dame Fighting Irish football team.

References

He is the brother of musician Everett Bradley.

1955 births
Living people
Sportspeople from Florence, South Carolina
All-American college football players
American football cornerbacks
Notre Dame Fighting Irish football players
Detroit Lions players
Chicago Blitz players
Arizona Wranglers players
Houston Gamblers players